The 2015 IIHF Women's Challenge Cup of Asia Division I was an international women's ice hockey tournament run by the International Ice Hockey Federation. The tournament took place between 6 November and 7 November 2014 in Taipei, Taiwan and was the second edition held since its formation in 2013 under the IIHF Challenge Cup of Asia series of tournaments. Chinese Taipei won the tournament after winning all four of their games and finishing first in the standings. Thailand finished in second place and Hong Kong finished third.

Overview
The 2015 IIHF Women's Challenge Cup of Asia Division I began on 6 November 2014 in Taipei City, Taiwan, with the games played at Annex Ice Rink. Hong Kong and Thailand returned after competing in last years tournament and Chinese Taipei made their debut appearance in Division I and in international competition. Singapore and the United Arab Emirates did not send a team after previously competing in the 2014 edition.

Chinese Taipei won the tournament after winning all four of their games and finishing first in the standings. Thailand finished second with four points and claimed their second Division I silver medal. Last years winner, Hong Kong, finished in last place after managing only one shootout win against Thailand. Chinese Taipei's Hui-Chen Yeh finished as the tournaments top scorer with eight points and Tzu-Ting Hsu finished as the tournaments leading goaltender with a save percentage of 100.00.

Standings

Fixtures
All times are local. (NST – UTC+8)

Scoring leaders
List shows the top ten skaters sorted by points, then goals, assists, and the lower penalties in minutes.

Leading goaltenders
Only the top goaltenders, based on save percentage, who have played at least 40% of their team's minutes are included in this list.

See also
 List of sporting events in Taiwan

References

External links
Tournament page at IIHF.com

IIHF Women's Challenge Cup of Asia Division I
IIHF Women's Challenge Cup of Asia Division I
IIHF Women's Challenge Cup of Asia Division I
IIHF Women's Challenge Cup of Asia
International ice hockey competitions hosted by Taiwan